Arlene Julia Lesewski (born April 12, 1936) is an American politician in the state of Minnesota. She served in the Minnesota State Senate.

References

1936 births
Living people
People from Lyon County, Minnesota
Southwest Minnesota State University alumni
Businesspeople from Minnesota
Women state legislators in Minnesota
Republican Party Minnesota state senators
21st-century American women